The Coleman Bobcats were a West Texas League baseball team based in Coleman, Texas, United States that played from 1928 to 1929. In 1929, they won the league championship under managers Honus Mitze and Jack Holloway. They are the only professional baseball team to ever come out of Coleman, Texas.

Notable players include Jo-Jo Moore and Fabian Kowalik.

References

Baseball teams established in 1928
Baseball teams disestablished in 1929
Defunct minor league baseball teams
1928 establishments in Texas
1929 disestablishments in Texas
Defunct baseball teams in Texas
Coleman County, Texas